Oczy Mlody  (an erroneous Polish phrase, which could mean "the young eyes") is the fourteenth studio album by experimental rock band the Flaming Lips, released on January 13, 2017, on Warner Bros in the US and Bella Union in the UK. It is the first album to feature Jake Ingalls who joined the group in 2013.

Background and recording process
Studio work on the band's album The Terror wrapped up in April 2012, the year before Ingalls joined. Recordings for Oczy Mlody began only two months later and continued intermittently for four years in parallel with much other activity. In 2013 the band released a Stone Roses cover album. After touring for The Terror wrapped up in 2014, longtime member Kliph Scurlock was fired from the band. About the same time, the band teamed up with Miley Cyrus, who appeared on a covers version of the 1967 album Sgt. Pepper's Lonely Hearts Club Band by the Beatles titled With a Little Help from My Fwends. The following year, they assisted her with recording Miley Cyrus & Her Dead Petz, and went on tour as her backing band in support of the album. Recordings for Oczy Mlody eventually finished in June 2016, and the album was released on 13 January 2017.

Title
In two videos released in late 2016, frontman Wayne Coyne describes how he found the album title and some of the song titles and lyrics in a second-hand book, a Polish translation of Erskine Caldwell's Close to Home, titled Blisko domu. He and the band liked the words primarily due to their sound, rather than their meaning.

In any event, the grammatical cases, genders and word order in the Polish phrase are erroneous: oczy (eyes) is plural, and młody (young) is masculine singular. The correct translation of "The Young Eyes" would be: Młode oczy. Unless, the author's intention was to say: Oczy młodych, which translates to "The Eyes of the Young [People]".

Reception

Oczy Mlody was released to positive to mixed reviews from critics. AllMusic's Heather Phares gave the album 3.5/5 stars and noted that "Though its title is Polish for 'the eyes of the young', the Flaming Lips' state of mind on their Oczy Mlody album isn't exactly naive [sic]", ultimately concluding that "Though ['We a Famly''s] happy ending feels a bit tacked-on compared to the rest of Oczy Mlody's trippy melancholy, its meaning is clear: finding hope isn't easy, but seen the right way, it can be an adventure." Clash Magazine gave the album a positive 8/10 score and noted that "Lyrically, Oczy Mlody falls into quixotic non-sequiturs that will either have you nodding sagely or rolling your eyes, depending on your disposition ('Legalise it, every drug right now', anyone?), but that's par for the course. They've managed to meld together the grand themes of The Soft Bulletin and Yoshimi... with some of the experimentation of Embryonic and The Terror, and it makes for a fascinating return." In a highly positive review, Slant Magazine's Jonathan Wroble awarded the album 4.5/5 stars and praised it for being a "masterstroke of rhythm and tone that neither trips head-on into bliss nor spins into dismay". A more mixed review came from Rolling Stone, who gave the album 3/5 stars and noted that it's "decidedly more stripped back and puts a fresh gleam on the Lips' usual pucker", but that "Aside from a lousy plot, Oczy Mlody's only other failing is it's a slow build" and concluded that "The album is a bitter pill at first [sic] but it pays off to tune in and turn on".

On Metacritic, the album has a 69/100 score based on 31 critics, indicating "generally favorable reviews".

Track listing

Charts

References

2017 albums
The Flaming Lips albums
Warner Records albums
Albums with cover art by Robert Beatty (artist)
Albums recorded at Tarbox Road Studios